This is a list of airfields operated by the United States Navy which are located within the United States and abroad. The US Navy's main airfields are designated as Naval Air Stations or Naval Air Facilities, with Naval Outlying Landing Fields (NOLF) and Naval Auxiliary Landing Fields (NALF) having a support role. 

Some airfields are parented by a larger naval installation or are part of a Joint Base operated jointly with another part of the US military.

Active airfields

Naval air stations and other airfields

Outlying and auxiliary landing fields 
A naval outlying landing field (NOLF) or naval auxiliary landing field (NALF) is an auxiliary airfield with no based units or aircraft, and minimal facilities. They are used as a low-traffic locations for flight training, without the risks and distractions of other traffic at naval air stations or other large airfields.

Overseas airfields

Former airfields

Naval airfields within the United States

Former overseas airfields

References

US Navy
Naval Air Stations